Protein diaphanous homolog 2 is a protein that in humans is encoded by the DIAPH2 gene.

Function 

This gene may play a role in the development and normal function of the ovaries. Mutations of this gene have been linked to premature ovarian failure. Alternative splicing results in two protein isoforms.

Interactions 

DIAPH2 has been shown to interact with RhoD.

References

Further reading